The 2009 Indian Premier League season, abbreviated as IPL 2 or the 2009 IPL, was the second season of the Indian Premier League, established by the Board of Control for Cricket in India (BCCI) in 2007. The tournament was hosted by South Africa and was played between 18 April and 24 May 2009. It was the second biggest cricket tournament in the world, after the Cricket World Cup, and was forecast to have an estimated television audience of more than 200 million people in India alone. The tagline was Divided by nations, United by IPL. 

As the second season of the IPL coincided with multi-phase 2009 Indian general elections, in the aftermath of the 3 March 2009 attack on the Sri Lanka national cricket team the Government of India refused to commit security by Indian paramilitary forces. As a result, the BCCI decided to host the second season of the league outside India. On 24 March 2009, the BCCI officially announced that the second season of the IPL was to be held in South Africa. Though India did not host the second season, the format of the tournament remained unchanged from the 2008 season format.

The IPL injected approximately US$100 million into South Africa's local economy. In addition, the BCCI signed an  82 billion (US$1.63 billion) contract with Multi Screen Media to broadcast matches live from South Africa to India.

The IPL was hosted successfully in South Africa and was hailed as an "extraordinary" accomplishment. The tournament was particularly praised for globalizing cricket and had set record television viewership. The tournament was won by Deccan Chargers, who beat the Royal Challengers Bangalore in the final.

Venues

Rules and regulations
Some of the rules were changed for the 2009 edition of the IPL. The number of international players allowed in any one squad was increased from 8 to 10 although the number allowed in any playing 11 remained at 4. The IPL sanctioned franchises to spend a further US$2 million during the auction taking the total salary cap for each franchise to US$7 million for the 2009 tournament. The BCCI also negotiated with England Cricket Board (ECB) to allow English cricketers to participate in the tournament. English players were allowed to play for 21 days in between their tour to West Indies and the subsequent return tour.

At the halfway point of each innings, a seven-and-a-half-minute television timeout was now held. The change proved controversial, as critics and players felt that it broke the flow of the game, and because two-thirds of the break were devoted purely to additional advertising time. The timeout rules were revised for the 2010 season.

The format is the same as previous season. Points in the group stage were awarded as follows:

If the match ends with the scores tied and there must be a winner, the tie is broken with a one over per side "Eliminator" or "Super Over":
 Higher number of points
 If equal, higher number of wins
 If still equal, net run rate
 If still equal, lower bowling strike rate
 If still equal, result of head-to-head meeting.

Teams and standings

Points table
(C) = Eventual champion; (R) = Runner-up.
Winner, runner-up and best-performing semi-finalist in the group stage qualify for the 2009 Champions League Twenty20.

Match summary

League stage
Times are in Indian Standard Time (UTC+05:30). Subtract 3.5 hours for local time in South Africa

 Rajasthan Royals score of 14/2 from the powerplay is the lowest in IPL history 
 Rajasthan Royals total of 58 is the second lowest in IPL history 

 Deccan Chargers became the first IPL team to hit a six off the final ball of a match to win

Playoffs

Semifinals

Final

Statistics and awards

Most runs

 The tournament's leading scorer wore an orange cap when fielding.

Full Table on Cricinfo

Most wickets

 The tournament's leading wicket taker wore a purple cap when fielding.

Full Table on cricinfo

Awards 
Player of the tournament: Adam Gilchrist - Deccan Chargers
Player of the final: Anil Kumble - Royal Challengers Bangalore
Under-23 success of the tournament: Rohit Sharma (333 runs, 11 wickets) - Deccan Chargers
Kingfisher Fair Play Award: Kings XI Punjab

See also
List of 2009 Indian Premier League personnel changes

References

External links 
 Official website
 Cricinfo – Indian Premier League
 IPL 2009 - Statistics

 
Indian Premier League seasons
Indian Premier League, 2009
Premier